Thomas James Williams (28 May 1876 – 18 Sept 1938) was an Australian rules footballer who played with Essendon in the Victorian Football League (VFL).

Early life
The son of David Elias Williams and Beatrice Williams, nee Nicol, Thomas James Williams was born at Sale on 28 May 1876.

He married Alice Muriel Estella Beer (1888-1951) in 1909. Alice married John Henry Landvogt (1871-1949) in 1939.

Football

Richmond
In 1898 Tom Williams commenced his senior football career with Richmond in the Victorian Football Association, joining his brother Hugh at the club.

Leopold
Williams (and his brother) were granted a clearance to St Kilda at the start of the 1900 season but he is not credited with any games for St Kilda and he played with the Leopold club from 1901 until part way through the 1902 season.

West Perth
In 1902 Williams briefly played with the West Perth club in the West Australian Football Association.

Essendon
At the start of the 1903 season Williams played two VFL games for Essendon.

Leopold
After failing to gain a consistent place with Essendon, Williams returned to Leopold for the remainder of the 1903 season and was appointed as captain of the side.

Richmond
In 1904 Williams returned to Richmond and played for three more seasons, in total making 49 appearances for the team. He was a ruckman and a prominent player in their 1905 VFA premiership winning team.

Later life
Williams later moved to Ballarat where he died on 18 Sept 1938. He is buried at the Ballarat New Cemetery.

Notes

References
 Holmesby, Russell & Main, Jim (2014), The Encyclopedia of AFL Footballers: every AFL/VFL player since 1897 (10th ed.), Seaford, Victoria: BAS Publishing. 
 Maplestone, M., Flying Higher: History of the Essendon Football Club 1872–1996, Essendon Football Club, (Melbourne), 1996.

External links 
 
 
 Thomas Williams, at The VFA Project.

1876 births
1938 deaths
Australian rules footballers from Victoria (Australia)
Richmond Football Club (VFA) players
Essendon Football Club players
West Perth Football Club players